is a Japanese politician and the current governor of Saitama Prefecture in Japan. He assumed office replacing Kiyoshi Ueda in the August 2019 gubernatorial elections.

References 

1963 births
Living people
People from Saitama Prefecture
Governors of Saitama Prefecture
Members of the House of Councillors (Japan)
Democratic Party of Japan politicians
Japanese diplomats
Japanese Arabists
Keio University alumni

Politicians from Saitama Prefecture